Walter Augustus Abercrombie (born September 26, 1959) is a former professional American football running back and kick returner who played in the National Football League. He was selected in first round (12th overall) of the 1982 NFL Draft by the Pittsburgh Steelers after playing college football for Baylor. 
Abercrombie was born and raised in Waco, Texas and was a standout running back at Waco University High School before moving down the street to Baylor University.

As a standout running back for Baylor during the Grant Teaff era, Walter Abercrombie would leave a legacy unmatched by future Bears. As a two-time consensus All-Southwest Conference selection and the school's all-time leading rusher, Abercrombie would lead Baylor to a 26-15 record on the field during his standout career that stretched from 1978-81. During his first collegiate game in 1978 against No. 12 Texas A&M, Abercrombie set the standard for what was to be expected by rushing for 207 yards, establishing an NCAA record for rushing yards in a first contest. He went on to earn 1978 Southwest Conference freshman of the year honors, despite playing in just six games. During his career, he would lead Baylor to the 1979 Peach Bowl, the 1980 Southwest Conference title and an appearance in the 1981 Cotton Bowl. Abercrombie finished atop the Baylor record books in many offensive categories including yards rushed (3,665), rushing attempts (732), career 100-yard games (19) and yards per game (94). Following a remarkable career at Baylor, Abercrombie was a first-round draft pick (12th selection overall) by the Pittsburgh Steelers in 1982. He played for the Steelers from 1982-87 before spending his final two seasons with the Philadelphia Eagles from 1988-89. Abercrombie currently serves as the executive director of the Baylor "B" Association, the school's 700-member organization of former letterwinners

Abercrombie and his family still reside in Waco, Texas.

NFL career statistics

References

American football running backs
Baylor Bears football players
Sportspeople from Waco, Texas
Philadelphia Eagles players
Pittsburgh Steelers players
1959 births
Living people
Players of American football from Texas